Al son del mambo is a 1950 Mexican Musical film. It was directed by Chano Urueta and starring Amalia Aguilar and Adalberto Martínez.

Plot
Don Chonito Godinez (Adalberto Martínez), the wealthy owner of a business of Mexican enchiladas, flees Mexico to escape to the modern life and tries to find comfort in Havana. Don Chonito is convinced by a restoring called Maria La O (Amparo Arozamena) for days at a resort in the country. There, he coincides with his sister (Esther Luquín), a depressed American woman (Joan Page), a composer (Roberto Romagna) and two detectives (Joaquín García "Borolas" and Mario Garcia "Harapos"), which should give him some very important information. Under the administration of the Cuban singer Rita Montaner, and with songs and dances provided by her daughter Reyna (Amalia Aguilar), the estate which houses the complex, is a kind of cabaret that works all day. So the owners and all his friends (including the "King of Mambo" Damaso Perez Prado with full orchestra), Don Chonito decide to enjoy himself, doing nothing.

Cast
 Amalia Aguilar ... Reyna
 Adalberto Martínez "Resortes" ... Don Chonito
 Roberto Romaña ... Roberto Dávila
 Rita Montaner ... Rita
 Amparo Arozamena ... María La O
 Esther Luquin ... Linda
 Joaquín García "Borolas"
 Mario García "Harapos"
 Anabel Gutiérrez
 Joan Page
 Nacho Contla
 Damaso Perez Prado
 Juan Bruno Tarraza
 Dolly Sisters
 Beny Moré
 Los Tres Diamantes
 Pedro Galindo Galarza
 Chucho Martínez Gil
 Chelo La Rue & ballet
 Alberto Domínguez
 Yeyo

Reviews
The music of the Cuba Damaso Perez Prado could not go unnoticed in the Mexican cinema of the 1950s. Chano Urueta was the director responsible for giving life to this musical revue with a minimal plot, in which Roberto Romagna served as presenter, and the eccentric comedian Adalberto Martínez "Resortes" with the figure of Amalia Aguilar, rose like star in a film rife with musical numbers and attractive presences. The film is a document of great value for the musical rhythms of those days, with numbers of great artists like Rita Montaner and Perez Prado and the singer Pedro Galindo with mariachis, pianist Juan Bruno Tarraza and many others. Besides the music of Perez Prado, one also has the opportunity to see him as an actor, and watch "Resortes", Aguilar, Page, the voluptuous Dolly Sisters, and the young rising star Anabel Gutiérrez, enjoying the rhythm of the mambo.

References

External links
 
 Credits

1950 films
Mexican black-and-white films
Film revues
Mexican musical films
Rumberas films
1950s Spanish-language films
Films directed by Chano Urueta
1950 musical films
1950s Mexican films